Jared Simpson (born 4 January 1996) is an English former professional rugby league footballer who played for Huddersfield Giants in the Super League, as a .

Playing career
A product of the club's academy, Simpson made his senior début for the Giants on 7 June 2015 in a home encounter with the Wigan Warriors.

In December 2017 he signed a season-long loan deal with the Dewsbury Rams. He also had a loan spell at Oldham RLFC (Heritage № 1360).

In 2018, he decided to retire from rugby league to pursue a career outside of the sport.

Personal life
Jared Simpson is the son of Roger Simpson, who played rugby league for Bradford Northern and Batley.

References

External links
Huddersfield Giants profile
SL profile

1996 births
Living people
Dewsbury Rams players
English rugby league players
Huddersfield Giants players
Newcastle Thunder players
Oldham R.L.F.C. players
Rugby league fullbacks
Rugby league players from Huddersfield